Vietnam competed at the 2014 Summer Youth Olympics, in Nanjing, China from 16 August to 28 August 2014.

Medalists

Badminton

Vietnam qualified one athlete based on the 2 May 2014 BWF Junior World Rankings.

Singles

Doubles

Beach Volleyball

Vietnam qualified a girls' team by their performance at the AVC Qualification Tournament.

Gymnastics

Artistic Gymnastics

Vietnam qualified one athlete based on its performance at the 2014 Asian Artistic Gymnastics Championships.

Boys

Rowing

Vietnam qualified one boat based on its performance at the Asian Qualification Regatta.

Qualification Legend: FA=Final A (medal); FB=Final B (non-medal); FC=Final C (non-medal); FD=Final D (non-medal); SA/B=Semifinals A/B; SC/D=Semifinals C/D; R=Repechage

Swimming

Girls

Taekwondo

Vietnam qualified one athlete based on its performance at the Taekwondo Qualification Tournament.

Girls

Weightlifting 

Vietnam qualified 1 quota in the boys' events and 2 quotas in the girls' events based on the team ranking after the 2013 Weightlifting Youth World Championships.

Boys

Girls

References

2014 in Vietnamese sport
Nations at the 2014 Summer Youth Olympics
Vietnam at the Youth Olympics